Antonio Carlos Barrios Fernández (born 30 March 1957) is a Paraguayan physician and politician.

Barrios studied medicine at the Universidad Nacional de Asunción, where he specialized in Neonatology.

On 15 August 2013 he was sworn in as Health Minister of Paraguay in the cabinet of President Horacio Cartes.

References

External links
 Official website - Ministry of Health 

1957 births
Universidad Nacional de Asunción alumni
Paraguayan pediatricians
Health ministers of Paraguay
Living people